3 Remixes for the New Cold War is a 1998 remix EP by Rational Youth.

Track listing

References

Rational Youth albums
1998 EPs